The 2014–15 Texas Southern Tigers basketball team represented Texas Southern University during the 2014–15 NCAA Division I men's basketball season. The Tigers, led by third-year head coach Mike Davis, played their home games at the Health and Physical Education Arena and were members of the Southwestern Athletic Conference. They finished the season 22–13, 16–2 in SWAC play to be SWAC regular season champions. They defeated Alcorn State, Prairie View A&M, and Southern to become champions of the SWAC tournament and receive the conference's automatic bid to the NCAA tournament. As a 15 seed, they lost in the second round to Arizona.

Previous season 
The Tigers finished the 2013–14 season 19–5, 12–6 in SWAC play to finish in second place in conference. They defeated Grambling State, Alabama State, and Prairie View A&M to win the SWAC tournament and  earn the conference's automatic bid to the NCAA tournament. The Tigers received a 16 seed in the Tournament and lost in the First Four to Cal Poly.

Roster

Schedule

|-
!colspan=9 style=| Regular season

|-
!colspan=9 style=| SWAC tournament

|-
!colspan=9 style=| NCAA tournament

References

Texas Southern Tigers basketball seasons
Texas Southern
Texas Southern
Texas Southern Tigers basketball
Texas Southern Tigers basketball